Gattlin Tadd Griffith (born November 13, 1998) is an American actor, best known for portraying Walter Collins in the historical crime drama Changeling (2008), Tim Tyson in the autobiographical civil rights film Blood Done Sign My Name (2010) and for starring in the romantic drama Labor Day (2013). He also had episodic roles on TV series such as Cold Case, Eli Stone, Supernatural, Criminal Minds and the films The New Daughter and Green Lantern.

Life 
Griffith was born to film stuntman Tad Griffith and wife Wendy Morrison Griffith, and is the fourth generation of a champion trick riding and equestrian gymnastics family. His paternal grandfather, Dick Griffith, is in the ProRodeo Hall of Fame and the National Cowboy Hall of Fame, and his paternal grandmother, Connie Rosenberger Griffith, is in the National Cowgirl Hall of Fame. He has three younger brothers, Callder West, Arrden Hunt and Garrison Cahill. He played football for the Santa Clarita Warriors and he attended Bishop Alemany High School class of 2017. He now attends the University of California at Los Angeles, majoring in English. He starred in the films Under the Bed and Labor Day.

Filmography

Film

Television

Commercials
Home Depot as Jake/Son
Yamaha as Son
Mass Mutual as Brother
Disney Parks as Boy
Burger King (2009) as Boy (3 Commercials)

References

External links

1998 births
Living people
Male actors from California
American male child actors
American male film actors
American male television actors